This is a list of schools in the Cayman Islands.

Primary schools

Grand Cayman
 Theoline L. McCoy Primary School
 Sir John A. Cumber Primary School 
 Edna M. Moyle Primary School
 George Town Primary School
 East End Primary School
 Joanna Clarke Primary School
 Red Bay Primary School
 Prospect Primary School

Cayman Brac
 Creek and Spot Bay Infant School 
 Creek and Spot Bay Junior School 
 West End Primary School

Little Cayman
 Little Cayman Education Service

Secondary schools

Grand Cayman
 John Gray High School
 Clifton Hunter High School
 Cayman Islands Further Education Centre

Cayman Brac
 Layman E. Scott Sr. High School

Special schools

Grand Cayman
 Lighthouse School

Private schools
Cayman Academy
Grace Christian Academy 
St. Ignatius Catholic School
Cayman Prep and High School
Cayman International School
Triple C School
Truth For Youth School
First Baptist Christian School
Wesleyan Christian Academy
Hope Academy

Preschool & Playschool 

Bloom Learning Centre

See also
Education in the Cayman Islands

References

 
Schools
Cayman Islands
Schools